Hush is a 2016 horror drama short film written and directed by Michael Lewis Foster. The film stars Rachel Barker, Luke Bedsole, Eric Casalini and Ghadir Mounib. It screened at San Diego International Film Festival and Catalina Film Festival and won awards at Oceanside International Film Festival and Horrible Imaginings Film Festival. The film was distributed by Seed&Spark and Bloody Disgusting.

Plot 
Sadie is trying her best to be Caleb’s mother, but he makes life impossible to raise a child.

Cast 

 Rachel Barker as Sadie
 Luke Bedsole as Caleb
 Eric Casalini as J.J. McQuade
 Ghadir Mounib as J. Braddock

Production 
The film was made in San Diego and directed by Michael Foster. In an interview at MovieMaker Magazine, Foster claimed to have drawn inspiration for Hush from the 2012 Aurora, Colorado shooting.

Release 
Hush premiered at the San Diego International Film Festival. It later screened as part of New York No Limits Film Series, Catalina Film Festival, Chicago Horror Film Festival, NewFilmmakers LA, Hollywood Just 4 Shorts and was distributed by Seed&Spark and Bloody Disgusting. It screened virtually at Oceanside International Film Festival’s Ten Year Reprise in 2021 as part of the festival’s best films of 2017.

Reception 
Hush was featured among a panel of filmmakers at the premiere of Our Barrio, an event hosted by the IntelleXual Podcast at Museum of Photographic Arts. Foster later represented the film at a panel for San Diego Comic-Con. The film was recommended by KPBS’ Cinema Junkie at Horrible Imaginings Film Festival.

Critical response
Film critic Scott Marks at San Diego Reader calls the film a "dark, beautifully made, and brutally honest bouncing-baby short." Timothy Rawles at San Diego Gay and Lesbian News said the “structure of the story is put together with many uncomfortable and unexpected solutions.”

Accolades

References

External links 
 
 

2016 horror films
2016 short films
American horror drama films
Films set in San Diego
Films shot in San Diego
American horror short films
2010s horror drama films
Films about parenting
Films about children
Insomnia in film
Films about mother–son relationships
Films about single parent families
2010s English-language films